Iris Nell Carpenter Akers (September 21, c. 1904 - October 7, 1997) was a British journalist, author and war correspondent known for her frontline publications during World War II as a female journalist. Carpenter started her writing career in 1924 but resigned from her position to focus on raising her two children, Brian Scruby and Patricia Perry. When the Second World War broke out in England, Carpenter returned to journalism and worked with the Daily Herald, the London Daily Express and as a BBC broadcaster. During the war, Carpenter and her family moved to the United States after her position as a frontline war correspondent with the British army was denied. She began to write for the Boston Globe as a journalist, and for the U.S. Office of Education. Carpenter also hosted episodes as a radio broadcaster with the Voice of America and was a member of the American Women in Radio and Television.

Early life 
Carpenter was born in September 21, c.1904 in England and was the daughter of a wealthy cinema entrepreneur. Her upbringing and exposure to cinema helped her successfully land a position as a film critic in 1924 through a British publication called The Picture Show.

Inspired by this field, Carpenter began her career as a journalist with the Daily Express in London. 

In 1933, Carpenter stepped down from her position as a journalist to focus on raising her two children, Brian Scruby and Patricia Perry, with her first husband, Charles Scruby who was known to be a successful property developer.

Career 

On the early onsets of World War II, Carpenter witnessed five German planes being shot down close to her home. Carpenter decided to return to her career as a journalist and began working with the Daily Herald in London to cover special war reports such as the Blitz. She also worked as a BBC broadcaster and print reporter for the Daily Express and the Daily Herald in 1940, where she wrote a great deal of the war frontlines. Her reports included bloodshed, destruction, and heroic acts of courage in the Battle of Britain.

Carpenter was determined to position herself in the frontlines and document the conflict in Europe. In 1942, Carpenter applied to the British Expeditionary Force, convinced that her previous experiences as a war correspondent earned her spot alongside the Allied invasion of Europe. However, her application was vetoed and ultimately rejected by British military authorities.

Carpenter decided to move to America where she successfully found a position with the Boston Globe as a frontline journalist. After meeting with Carlyle Holt, another war correspondent from Boston Globe, she was accepted and joined the U.S. 1st Army as a war correspondent and documented the American involvement during the war.

Carpenter notes that female reporters were received more positively with American troops. It was emphasized by Colonel Andres of the U.S. 1st Army, claiming that all females under his jurisdiction would receive equal treatment  and that American officials acknowledged that women excelled at covering specific areas of war.

Four days after D-Day, June 10, 1944, Iris Carpenter arrived on the Allied-controlled strips of Normandy and was among the first women to do so in an ambulance plane. Iris documented the discrimination and hostility faced by the British War Office toward female reporters, emphasizing that women would distract their soldiers from their duties.

Although Carpenter was given frontline positions, her role did not equate to other war correspondents. For instance, Carpenter arrived with her fellow correspondent Cornelius Ryan on site. Ryan was granted access into Normandy whereas Carpenter was limited to a beachhead airstrip. Other reports included her experiences at hospitals and war-torn villages.

Carpenter was fully accredited to accompany the First Army in December 1944 as they advanced in France towards an immediate beachhead at Normandy and alongside the Allied forces as the German troops retreated across the River Orne.

During one of her visits to London, Carpenter was accused of violating press regulations and policies when she transferred her position along the frontlines with the American troops. Carpenter countered the allegation, explaining that the beachhead area changed due to natural conditions and that no press regulations were violated.

Following the Paris liberation in August 1944, Carpenter continued to report on the war despite having shattered an eardrum, being caught in a storm, and traveling under precarious circumstances.

Carpenter documented the participation of American troops, the reactions of local individuals toward Nazi oppression, experiences of wounded soldiers, concentration camps, and the stories of medical staff. Events covered by Carpenter include but are not limited to the London bombing in 1940 (The Blitz), the Normandy invasion included the bombing of Saint-Lô, Battle of Arnhem, Battle of Huertgen Forest, Battle of the Bulge, and Rhine.

Later life 
After the war had ended, Carpenter divorced with her first husband, Charles Scruby. She remarried to American Colonel and the First Army's operations officer, Russel F. Akers Jr on January 20, 1946. Akers was the operations officer of the First Army, the American army she had been following during the war and moved to the United States with her children shortly thereafter. She became a war correspondent through The Boston Globe and was known to be one of the few female journalists to document the war from the frontlines.

In June 1945, Carpenter completed her war time reports and began working with the Voice of America. She settled her life in Virginia, United States much towards her retirement.

In 1946, she published her war memoir, No Woman’s World, accounting the experiences of other female reporters and noting the challenges facing women reporters on the frontlines during World War Two. Iris Carpenter passed away on October 7, 1997, at the age of 93 due to heart failure at North Arundel Hospital in Glen Burnie.

Legacy 
Iris Carpenter was a prominent British journalist and war correspondent who wrote for London's Daily Herald, London Daily Express, and the Boston Globe. Her work with the BBC broadcast and the Voice of America remains in the archives today.

Carpenter was known to be one of the few women to report the Allied invasions in Europe since June 1944, making her publications more pronounced and well known during World War II. The articles published across UK and U.S. media ports along with her memoir, No Woman’s World, include personal anecdotes and frontline reports based on interviews held from hospitals in France and Germany, along with documentation of the liberation of Nazi concentration camps. 

Some of her most reputable pieces include reports on the Battle of the Bulge and the liberation of Nazi concentration camps, both of which were featured on the Boston Globe. Her courage to write from the frontlines was a momentous leap for female journalists, which enabled them to focus beyond the gendered norms. Her push towards war contribution also demonstrated that women are not stuck to being confined to small narratives in the journalist world, reinforcing the notion that women do have equal qualifications as men.

In 1946, her memoir, No Woman’s World, recounted her wartime experiences during World War II. The memoir talks about the uncertainty and vulnerability female reporters faced on site, while also encountering various gendered rules they had to agree upon to keep their positions. Some of these rules included the restriction of female reporters and their topics, prompting that female journalists should cover news topics regarding the home-front. Other rules suggested women should be nowhere remotely near the war frontlines.

Carpenter struggled to fight for the same rights as male correspondents within the press camps and recognized the difficulty in gaining equal access to her male counterparts. Despite the obstacles she encountered, she was known to bypass restrictions and rules in order to get frontline stories that were weighed just as importantly as male journalists.

Carpenter's memoir brought to light the difficulties that female correspondents faced and efforts that female journalists needed to put in in order to gain the a little bit of respect. She proved that women did not only have to report on hospitals and domestic situations through her memoir.

Her fearlessness brought her to follow the US Army from the Battle of Arnhem through Antwerp, Aachen and the Rhine. She was also present during the Battle of Hurtgen Forest and stayed with the army until the Battle of Bulge. These newspaper clips have now become important pieces of history that she had risked her life to gather. Her memoir depicts her journey as well as stories of American soldiers caring for each other throughout the war. These accomplishments paved the way for future female journalists to gain the same treatment as male journalists in the field.

Publications 
Memoir: No Woman's World (1946)

See also 
 The Boston Globe
 Cornelius Ryan
 Women in journalism

References

Further reading 
 Beasley, Maurine H. "Women and Journalism in World War II: Discrimination and Progress," in American Journalism. Vol. 12, no. 3. Summer 1995, pp. 321–333.
 Edwards, Julia. Women of the World: The Great Foreign Correspondents. Boston, MA: Houghton Mifflin, 1988.
 Redstone-Lewis, J. A. (2007). The creation of the Women's Royal Canadian Naval Service and its role in Canadian naval intelligence and communications, 1939–45. 
 Wagner, Lilya. Women War Correspondents of World War II. NY: Greenwood Press, 1989.

1900s births
1997 deaths
Year of birth uncertain
20th-century British journalists
British women journalists
Daily Express people
20th-century English memoirists
Voice of America people
The Boston Globe people